America's Most Smartest Model is an American reality television show that aired on VH1. The hosts were Ben Stein and Mary Alice Stephenson. The show attempted to find brains behind beauty in a series of challenges, and would grant the winner $100,000, a feature in an upcoming VO5 ad, and the title of America's Most Smartest Model.

The winner of the competition was 22 year-old VJ Logan from Grass Valley, California.

Contestants

(ages stated are at start of filming)

Episodes

Balls, Cherries, Balloons, Tires
First aired October 7, 2007 (1.6M viewers)

Edge Challenge Winner: Daniel
Callback Challenge Winner: Brett
Eliminated: Victoria, Gaston, Slavco, Jamie

Governor Of Presidents

Edge Challenge Winners: Rachael Murphy, Pickel
Callback Challenge Winners: Rachael Murphy, Pickel
Bottom Four: Daniel, Jesse, Mandy Lynn, Erika
Eliminated: Erika

Balm and Gilad

Special Guest Star: Gilad Janklowicz
Edge Challenge Winners: VJ, Pickel, Brett
Callback Challenge Winner: Brett
Bottom Three: Rachel Myers, Jesse, Mandy Lynn
Eliminated: Mandy Lynn

Night of The Hairy Grizilla Monster

Special Guest Star: Bill Nye
Edge Challenge Winners: Daniel, Angela
Callback Challenge Winners: Andre, Rachael Murphy
Bottom Three: Rachel Myers, Lisa, Jesse
Eliminated: Jesse

That's Not How I Like My Pork!

Edge Challenge Winner: Daniel
Callback Challenge Winner: VJ
Bottom Two: Rachel Myers, Lisa
Eliminated: Lisa

Are You Ready to Rhombus?

Edge Challenge Winners: Pickel, Brett
Callback Challenge Winners: Pickel, Brett
Bottom Four: VJ, Rachael Murphy, Daniel, Rachel Myers
Eliminated: Rachel Myers

Many Happy Returns?

Edge Challenge Winner: VJ
Callback Challenge Winner: Andre
Bottom Three: Angela, Rachael, Daniel
Eliminated: Daniel

Let's Play, Hide The Pickel

Edge Challenge Winners: Angela, VJ
Callback Challenge Winner: Angela
Bottom Three: Andre, Brett, Pickel
Eliminated: Pickel

I See Dead People...

Edge Challenge Winners: Andre, Rachael
Callback Challenge Winner: Angela, VJ
Bottom Three: Andre, Brett, Rachael
Eliminated: Brett, Rachael

Hit Me With Your Best Shot

Edge Challenge Winner: Andre
Bottom Two: VJ, Angela
Eliminated: Angela

Never Trust a Rottweiler
First aired December 17, 2007 (1M viewers)

Runner-Up: Andre
Winner: VJ

Elimination table

 The contestant was eliminated before the elimination ceremony.
 The contestant won the callback challenge
 The contestant was selected as one of the top entries in the callback challenge, but did not win.
 The contestant was selected as one of the bottom entries in the callback challenge, but was not eliminated.
 The contestant was eliminated.
 The contestant won the competition

Because Rachel was eliminated at the callback challenge in episode 6, no one was eliminated at the elimination ceremony.
Episode 9 featured a double elimination.

See also

 America's Next Top Model (2003)
 Make Me a Supermodel (2008)

References

External links
 America's Most Smartest Model at VH1.com
 

2007 American television series debuts
2007 American television series endings
2000s American reality television series
English-language television shows
Modeling-themed reality television series
VH1 original programming